The Age of Aquarius is the fourth album by American pop group the 5th Dimension, released in 1969 (see 1969 in music). It was their biggest commercial success in the United States, peaking at number two on the Billboard 200 and the Top R&B Albums charts.

Track listing 

Side One
 "Medley: Aquarius/Let the Sunshine In (The Flesh Failures)" (Galt MacDermot, James Rado, Gerome Ragni) – 4:51
 "Blowing Away" (Laura Nyro) – 2:32
 "Skinny Man" (Michael Kollander, Ginger Kollander) – 2:51
 "Wedding Bell Blues" (Laura Nyro) – 2:44
 "Don'tcha Hear Me Callin' to Ya" (Rudy Stevenson) – 3:56
 "The Hideaway" (Jimmy Webb) – 2:45

Side Two
 "Workin' On a Groovy Thing" (Roger Atkins, Neil Sedaka) – 3:10
 "Let It Be Me" (Gilbert Bécaud, Mann Curtis, Pierre Delanoë) – 3:54
 "Sunshine of Your Love" (Pete Brown, Jack Bruce, Eric Clapton) – 3:18
 "The Winds of Heaven" (Bob Dorough, Fran Landesman) – 3:14
 "Those Were the Days" (Gene Raskin) – 3:03
 "Let the Sunshine In (Reprise)" (MacDermot, Rado, Ragni) – 1:29

Bonus tracks
 "Chissa Se Tornera (Who Knows If He Will Return)" (Mario De Sanctis, Antonio Salis, Lucio Salis) – 3:00 [Bonus track; 2000 CD reissue only]

Personnel 
 Billy Davis Jr. - lead vocals (tracks 1, 8), background vocals
 Florence LaRue - lead vocals (track 2), background vocals 
 Marilyn McCoo - lead vocals (tracks 2, 4), background vocals 
 Lamonte McLemore - background vocals
 Ron Townson - background vocals

Additional personnel
 Dennis Budimir- guitar
 Mike Deasy - guitar
 Bill Fulton - guitar
 Tommy Tedesco - guitar
 Joe Osborn - bass
 Hal Blaine - drums, percussion
 Larry Bunker  - mallets, congas, percussion
 Milt Holland - percussion 
 Pete Jolly - keyboards
 Larry Knechtel - keyboards
 Jimmy Rowles - keyboards
 Bill Holman - Strings & Brass - string section, horn section
 Tony Terran - Trumpet

Production 

 Producer: Bones Howe
 Engineer: Bones Howe
 Mastering: Elliot Federman
 Digital transfers: Mike Hartry
 Reissue producer: Rob Santos
 Production coordination: Jeremy Holiday
 Production assistant: Ann McClelland, Tom Tierney, Russ Wapensky
 Project coordinator: Arlessa Barnes, Glenn Delgado, Christina DeSimone, Robin Diamond, Karyn Friedland, Felicia Gearhart, Laura Gregory, Robin Manning, Brooke Nochomson, Ed Osborne, Larry Parra, Dana Renert, Bill Stafford, Steve Strauss
 Archives coordinator: Joanne Feltman, Glenn Korman
 Musical arrangements: Bob Alcivar, Bill Holman, Bones Howe
 Vocal arrangement: Bob Alcivar
 Art direction: Ron Wolin
 Reissue art director: Mathieu Bitton
 Design: Mathieu Bitton, Ron Wolin
 Photography: Ed Caraeff
 Liner notes: Mike Ragogna

Charts and awards

Album 

Billboard (United States)

Singles 

Billboard (United States)

Grammys

|-
| rowspan="5" | 1970 || rowspan="2" | The Age of Aquarius || Album of the Year || 
|-
| Best Engineered Album, Non-Classical || 
|-
| rowspan="3" | "Aquarius/Let the Sunshine In" || Record of the Year || 
|-
| Best Pop Performance by a Duo or Group with Vocals || 
|-
| Best Arrangement, Instrumental and Vocals ||

References 

1969 albums
The 5th Dimension albums
Albums produced by Bones Howe
Soul City Records (American label) albums